The 2008 Skate Canada International was the second event of six in the 2008–09 ISU Grand Prix of Figure Skating, a senior-level international invitational competition series. It was held at the Scotiabank Place in Ottawa, Ontario on October 30 – November 2. Medals were awarded in the disciplines of men's singles, ladies' singles, pair skating, and ice dancing. Skaters earned points toward qualifying for the 2008–09 Grand Prix Final. The compulsory dance was the Pasodoble.

Schedule
The switch from daylight saving time to standard time was on November 2. Therefore, the events on Friday and Saturday were UTC-4, and the events on Sunday were UTC-5.

 Friday, October 31
 12:05 Pairs' short program
 14:10 Ladies' short program
 18:30 Compulsory dance
 19:45 Men's short program
 Saturday, November 1
 10:45 Original dance
 13:25 Pairs' free skating
 16:05 Men's free skating
 17:45 Medal ceremonies - Men and pairs
 19:05 Ladies' free skating
 20:50 Medal ceremonies - Ladies
 Sunday, November 2
 12:15 Free dance
 13:30 Medal ceremonies - Ice dancing
 15:05 Exhibition gala

Results

Men

Ladies

Pairs

Ice dancing

External links

 2008 Skate Canada official site
 Skate Canada International at Skate Canada
 
 
 
 
 
 

Skate Canada International, 2008
Skate Canada International
Sports competitions in Ottawa
2008 in Canadian sports
2008 in Ontario
2000s in Ottawa
October 2008 sports events in Canada
November 2008 sports events in Canada